Jin Hui (born 10 March 1988), is a Chinese footballer who currently plays for Beijing Renhe in the China League One.

Club career
Jin Hui started his professional football career in July 2010 when he joined Beijing Baxy for the 2010 China League One campaign. On 7 January 2018, Jin transferred to Chinese Super League side Beijing Renhe. He made his Super League debut on 7 November 2018 in a 2–1 away loss against Shanghai SIPG, coming on as a substitute for Chen Jie in the 80th minute.

Career statistics 
Statistics accurate as of match played 31 December 2019.

References

External links
 

1988 births
Living people
Chinese footballers
Footballers from Henan
China League One players
Chinese Super League players
Beijing Sport University F.C. players
Beijing Renhe F.C. players
Association football forwards